"Sunshine" is the debut solo single by hip-hop artist, Alphrisk, formerly of the Deceptikonz released in 2005.  The single features Adeaze.

Song information

Track listings
Sunshine (Radio Edit) 
Sunshine (Instrumental) 
Sunshine (A Cappella)

2005 singles
New Zealand hip hop songs
2005 songs